Officers and soldiers of the Indian Army wear cap badges (metallic or embroidered badges) on their beret or peaked caps. The design is based on the regimental insignia or coat of arms.

The infantry and the armoured corp regiments wear the unit insignia of their individual regiments. Individual regiments or units in other combat arms and the service arms wear the insignia of their corps or arm.

Officers of the rank of Brigadier and above wear embroidered badges having the Ashoka emblem with crossed baton and sword.

Infantry Regiments

Armoured Corps

Other Corps

Related organisations

Notes

References 

Military insignia
cap badges
National symbols of India